Adams may refer to:
 For persons, see Adams (surname)

Places

United States
Adams, California
Adams, California, former name of Corte Madera, California
Adams, Decatur County, Indiana
Adams, Kentucky
Adams, Massachusetts, a New England town
Adams (CDP), Massachusetts, the central village in the town
Adams, Minnesota
Adams, North Dakota
Adams, Nebraska
Adams, New Jersey
Adams (town), New York
Adams (village), New York, within the town
Adams, Oklahoma
Adams, Oregon
Adams, Pennsylvania, a former community in Armstrong County
Adams, Tennessee
Adams, Wisconsin, city in Adams County
Adams, Adams County, Wisconsin, town
Adams, Green County, Wisconsin, town
Adams, Jackson County, Wisconsin, town
Adams, Walworth County, Wisconsin, unincorporated community
Adams Center, Wisconsin, a ghost town

Elsewhere
Adams (lunar crater)
Adams (Martian crater)
Adams Island, New Zealand, one of the Auckland Islands
Adams, Ilocos Norte

Transportation
Vehicles
Adams (1903 automobile), an early 20th-century British automobile
Adams (automobile), an early 20th-century (1905-14) British automobile 
Adams-Farwell, an American automobile of the late 19th and early 20th-century (1889-1912)
Adams (constructor), a former racing car constructor

Vessels
Adams (brig), early 19th-century ship
USS Adams, several ships

Other uses
MSC Adams, a multibody dynamics simulation software
Adams (retailer), a children's clothes retailer
Adam's ale, meaning water
Adams Golf, a Texas-based golf club manufacturer
Adams' Grammar School, Newport, Shropshire, England
Adams House (disambiguation), a reference to any of several historic houses
Adams Park, a football stadium in Buckinghamshire, England
Adams, a brand of jockstrap
Adams Musical Instruments
Anomaly Detection at Multiple Scales a project of the American military, designed to identify patterns and anomalies in very large data sets
Beaumont–Adams revolver, a 19th-century firearm
Cadbury Adams, confectionery company acquired by Cadbury from Pfizer in 2003
 ADAMS, short for Anti-Doping Administration and Management System, a database operated by the World Anti-Doping Agency (WADA)
 All Dulles Area Muslim Society, a mosque with many locations in Northern Virginia, United States

See also 

Adam (disambiguation)
Adams County (disambiguation)
Adams River (disambiguation)
Adams Township (disambiguation)
Mount Adams (disambiguation)
Justice Adams (disambiguation)
Adamsburg, Pennsylvania
Adamsdale (disambiguation)
Adamstown (disambiguation)
Adamsville (disambiguation)
Addams